Ushijima (written:  lit. "cow island") is a Japanese surname. Notable people with the surname include:

, Japanese baseball player
Margaret Ushijima (1927–2013), Hawaiian lawyer
, Japanese general
Reece Ushijima (born 2003), Japanese-American racing driver
, Japanese luger
, Japanese judoka

Fictional characters
, a character in the manga series Haikyu!!

See also
Ushijima the Loan Shark, a Japanese manga series

Japanese-language surnames